Glyphidocera percnoleuca is a moth in the family Autostichidae. It was described by Edward Meyrick in 1923. It is found in Brazil.

The wingspan is about 10 mm. The forewings are pale fuscous irrorated (sprinkled) with dark fuscous. The discal stigmata are cloudy and dark fuscous. The hindwings are ochreous whitish.

References

Moths described in 1923
Glyphidocerinae